Cristian da Silva (born 3 February 1971) is an Argentine former professional footballer who played in the United States for the MetroStars.

External links
Player profile at MetroFanatic.com
bigapplesoccer.com
Coaching Bio at New Jersey City University

1971 births
Living people
Footballers from Rosario, Santa Fe
Argentine footballers
Argentine expatriate footballers
Southern Connecticut Fighting Owls men's soccer players
New Jersey Stallions players
New York Red Bulls players
Staten Island Vipers players
Expatriate soccer players in the United States
Major League Soccer players
Association football defenders
Association football midfielders
Argentine expatriates in the United States